Ebbsfleet United Football Club is a professional football club based in Northfleet, Kent, England. As of the 2021–22 season, the club competes in the National League South, the sixth tier of English football.

The club was formed in 1946 from the merger of Gravesend United and Northfleet United, and was known as Gravesend & Northfleet before changing to its current name in 2007. Home matches have been played at Stonebridge Road since the club's inception. Between 2008 and 2013, the club was owned by the web-based venture MyFootballClub, whose members voted on player transfers, budgets and ticket prices among other things instead of those decisions being made exclusively by the club's management and staff as at most other clubs.

History

Gravesend & Northfleet
Gravesend & Northfleet F.C. was formed in 1946, following the Second World War, after a merger between Gravesend United (originally formed in 1893) and Northfleet United (originally formed in 1890) with the new club retaining the red & white home colours (and the Stonebridge Road stadium) of Northfleet United. From 1969 and 1971, Roy Hodgson, who later became manager of the national teams of Switzerland, United Arab Emirates, Finland and England, was a player at the club, making 59 appearances. In 1979, the team was one of the founder members of the Alliance Premier League, but were relegated back into the Southern League Premier Division three seasons later.

For the 1997–98 season, Gravesend & Northfleet left the Southern League and joined the Isthmian League. They played in the Premier Division of the league until the 2001–02 season, when they finished as champions and earned promotion back into the Football Conference.

MyFootballClub takeover

On 13 November 2007, it was announced that the website MyFootballClub had entered a deal in principle to take over the club. Approximately 27,000 MyFootballClub members each paid £35 to provide an approximate £700,000 takeover fund and all owned an equal share in the club but made no profit nor received a dividend.  Members had a vote on transfers as well as player selection and all major decisions.  Because of the nature of MyFootballClub, it was announced that manager Liam  Daish would become instead the first team head coach. His backroom staff would remain at the club.

Between 16 and 23 January 2008, MyFootballClub members were given the choice to vote on whether to proceed with the takeover and whether to allow Liam Daish to continue with his plans for the January transfer window. Both resulted in overwhelming "Yes" votes: 95.89% voted to proceed with the takeover while 95.86% voted to allow  Liam Daish to continue his transfer plans.  The deal was ratified at an Extraordinary General Meeting of the club's board on 19 February.

On 10 May 2008, Ebbsfleet United won the FA Trophy, defeating Torquay United 1–0 in the final in front of 40,000 fans on the club's first trip to Wembley, becoming the first Kentish team to win this trophy. Ebbsfleet United went on to win the Kent Senior Cup in the same season, with a 4–0 victory over Cray Wanderers on 26 July 2008.

After one year of ownership a majority of MyFC members failed to renew, with membership numbers dropping from a peak of 32,000 at the time of the takeover to just over 9,000 on deadline day 2009. The club had previously stated that 15,000 was the minimum required. As of September 2010, two and a half years after the takeover, there were around 3,500 members.

The club remained in the Football Conference until being relegated to the Conference South at the end of the 2009–10 season. On 28 September veteran Jimmy Jackson played his 500th game for the club.

In an October 2010 vote among MyFC members, the earlier decision to allow the team manager autonomy in transfer dealings was rescinded by a majority of 35 on a total vote of 132, meaning that the membership would have 48 hours to endorse a proposed signing or sale before it can be finalised.  Both the manager and the club secretary opposed the change.

On 15 May 2011, Ebbsfleet United won the Conference South play-off final 4–2 against Farnborough and were thus promoted back to the Conference Premier at the first time of asking,

On 23 December 2011, it was announced that the club needed to raise £50,000 by the end of the 2011–12 season or risk going out of business.

On 23 April 2013 it was announced that MyFC's members had voted in favour of handing two-thirds of MyFC's shares to the Fleet Trust, a supporters' trust for the club, and the final one third to one of the club's major shareholders (believed to be former club chairman Brian Killcullen). Ebbsfleet United were relegated to the Conference South at the end of that season.

Kuwaiti ownership
KEH Sports Ltd, a group of Kuwaiti investors advised by a former chief executive of Charlton Athletic, agreed in May 2013 to take over the club, settling its debts (some at 10% of their value), promising investment in the squad and in a training facility. Liam Daish subsequently departed as manager and the new ownership appointed Dover Athletic coach and former Charlton Athletic defender Steve Brown as the new manager.

Steve Brown's first competitive game was a goalless draw at home to Havant & Waterlooville.  A club record was broken just before Christmas as Brown's team achieved nine wins in succession.  A 2–0 win over Sutton United, with both goals coming from Billy Bricknell, broke the long-standing record which subsequently put them amongst the title contenders but poor runs of form were to follow.  Ebbsfleet eventually reached the playoffs, helped by goalkeeper Preston Edwards keeping eleven clean sheets at Stonebridge Road over the course of the season. The playoff semi-final first leg against Bromley at Stonebridge Road ended in a 4–0 win for the Fleet. Despite Bromley winning the second leg, Brown's side won 4–1 on aggregate. The playoff final was against Dover Athletic at Stonebridge Road in front of a 4,200 crowd.  Dover dominated the encounter, winning 1–0 with a goal early in the second half from former Ebbsfleet striker Nathan Elder.

The 2014–15 season started with much promise, with wins against Concord Rangers & Havant & Waterlooville. However, the season failed to live up to expectations and Steve Brown was relieved of his duties the day after a 3–0 home defeat to Gosport Borough in November 2014. Jamie Day replaced Brown and, despite taking the club to the FA Trophy quarter-finals, where they lost to eventual winners North Ferriby United, he was relieved of his duties in April 2015. In the summer of 2015, former club captain Daryl McMahon was named as permanent manager. Matty Godden finished as the Fleet's top scorer for the 2014–15 season with 12 goals in all competitions.

The 2015–16 season was far more fruitful for the Fleet, as they led the league for almost the whole season, with results including a 6–0 win at home to Hemel Hempstead Town and a 5–0 win away to Hayes & Yeading United.  However, title rivals Sutton United went on a 26-game unbeaten run and clinched the league title by beating the Fleet 2–0 at Gander Green Lane. In the play-off semi-finals the Fleet edged past Whitehawk via a penalty shootout after a 3–3 draw on aggregate but lost on penalties in the final to rivals Maidstone United.

In the 2016–17 season Ebbsfleet again missed out on first place, this time to National League South champions Maidenhead United. Yet gained promotion to the National League with a 2–1 win at Stonebridge Road in the play-off final over Chelmsford City.  The following season the team achieved their highest ever league finish of 6th, beating Aldershot Town in the play-off qualifying round 5–4 on penalties. A heavy 4–2 defeat in the next round to league runners up Tranmere Rovers consigned Ebbsfleet to another season in the National League.

In October 2017, Stonebridge Road also became known as Kuflink Stadium as part of a five-year sponsorship deal.

The 2018–19 campaign did not reach the heights of the previous campaign with Daryl McMahon leaving the club in November following a 1–0 win over Barrow.  Former Woking manager Garry Hill was appointed manager of the club, his first game in the dugout being a goalless draw against Cheltenham Town in the FA Cup.  Despite an initial renaissance, the Fleet missed out on the playoffs following a winless April.

The 2019–20 season started with the Fleet losing all of their first five matches. In October 2019, Garry Hill left the club after just two wins in the opening 16 games of the season. Assistant Kevin Watson was appointed to the role on an interim basis before signing a seven-month contract to the end of the season. In February 2020 the ownership, KEH sports, appointed Damian Irvine to lead the club and oversee the day-to-day operations and all football matters. It was announced on 18 May 2020 that Kevin Watson's short-term contract as Manager would not be renewed and he would leave the club. The 2019–20 season was cancelled in March due to the worldwide COVID-19 pandemic with Ebbsfleet in the relegation places. Ebbsfleet United was relegated by 0.004 points after the league was determined on a points-per-game basis.

On 2 June 2020, German Dennis Kutrieb was appointed manager having declined to renew his contract at Tennis Borussia Berlin despite being on top of the table when the season was cancelled. On 17 June 2020 Ebbsfleet were confirmed among the list of clubs relegated from the National League on a weighted points per game basis.

Colours
Ebbsfleet's traditional home colours are red shirt with white detailing, white shorts and red socks.  Away colours have varied, with blue and white stripes favoured in the late eighties before colour combinations such as white/black and yellow/navy or black were used. MyFC members chose white with red detailing as the away colour in 2008–09, but a clash with the home colours of Woking and other clubs was not spotted until after the kit had been supplied, so a third shirt with green body and white sleeves was used with the white shorts and socks.  For the 2010–11 season, members made the unusual choice of purple for the away kit.

Seasons

Honours

League 
 Southern League  (Tier 5)
Champions (1): 1957–58
 Southern League Division One South (Tier 6)
Champions (1): 1974–75
Conference South (Tier 6)
Play-off winners (2): 2010–11, 2016–17
 Isthmian League Premier (Tier 6)
Champions (1): 2001–02
 Southern Football League (Tier 6)
Champions (1): 1993–94

Cups
FA Trophy
Winners (1): 2007–08
Southern League Cup
Winners (1): 1977–78
Kent Senior Cup
Winners (8): 1948–49, 1952–53, 1980–81, 1999–2000, 2000–01, 2001–02, 2007–08, 2013–14
Runners-up: 1947–48, 1976–77, 1990–91, 2005–06
Kent Floodlight Cup
Winners (1): 1969–70

Club personnel

Club officials

{|class="wikitable"
|-
!Position
!Staff
|-
|Chairman|| Abdulla Al-Humaidi
|-
|Directors|| Dherar Al Humaidi
|- 
|-

|-
|rowspan="2"|Associate Directors|| John Copus
|- 
|-
| Sue Copus
|-
|Chief Executive|| Damian Irvine
|- 
|
|-
|Finance Manager||
|-
|-
|Communications Manager|| Ed Miller
|-
|
|-

Management team

Players

Current squad

Out on loan

Notable former players

References

External links

 
Football clubs in Kent
National League (English football) clubs
Association football clubs established in 1946
Southern Football League clubs
Gravesham
Isthmian League
1946 establishments in England
Football clubs in England